Anorexia is a medical term for a loss of appetite. While the term outside of the scientific literature is often used interchangeably with anorexia nervosa, many possible causes exist for a loss of appetite, some of which may be harmless, while others indicate a serious clinical condition or pose a significant risk.

Anorexia is a symptom, not a diagnosis. Anorexia is not to be confused with the mental health disorder anorexia nervosa. Because the term 'anorexia' is often used as a short-form of anorexia nervosa, to avoid confusion a provider must clarify to a patient whether they are simply referring to a decreased appetite or the  mental health disorder. Anyone can manifest anorexia as a loss of appetite, regardless of their gender, age, or weight.

The symptom also occurs in other animals, such as cats, dogs, cattle, goats, and sheep. In these species, anorexia may be referred to as inappetence. As in humans, loss of appetite can be due to a range of diseases and conditions, as well as environmental and psychological factors.

Etymology 

Common manifestations 
Anorexia simply manifests as a decreased or loss of appetite. This can present as not feeling hungry or lacking the desire to eat. Sometimes people do not even notice they lack an appetite until they begin to lose weight from eating less. In other cases, it can be more noticeable, such as when a person becomes nauseated from just the thought of eating. Any form of decreased appetite that leads to changes in the body (such as weight loss or muscle loss) that is not done intentionally as part of dieting is clinically significant.

Physiology of anorexia 
Appetite stimulation and suppression is a complex process involving many different parts of the brain and body by the use of various hormones and signals. Appetite is thought to be stimulated by interplay between peripheral signals to the brain (taste, smell, sight, gut hormones) as well as the balance of neurotransmitters and neuropeptides  in the hypothalamus. Examples of these signals or hormones include neuropeptide Y, leptin, ghrelin, insulin, serotonin, and orexins (also called hypocretins). Anything that causes an imbalance of these signals or hormones can lead to the symptom of anorexia. While it is known that these signals and hormones help control appetite, the complicated mechanisms regarding a pathological increase or decrease in appetite are still being explored.

Common causes

Acute radiation syndrome
Addison's disease
Alcoholism
Alcohol withdrawal
Anemia
Anorexia nervosa
Anxiety
Appendicitis
Babesiosis
Benzodiazepine withdrawal
Bipolar disorder
Cancer
Cannabinoid hyperemesis syndrome
Cannabis withdrawal
Celiac disease
Chronic kidney disease
Chronic pain
Common cold
Constipation
COPD
COVID-19
Crohn's disease
Dehydration
Dementia
Depression
Ebola
Fatty liver disease
Fever
Food poisoning
Gastroparesis
Hepatitis
HIV/AIDS
Hypercalcemia
Hyperglycemia
Hypervitaminosis D
Hypothyroidism and sometimes hyperthyroidism
Irritable bowel syndrome
Ketoacidosis
Kidney failure
Low blood pressure
Mania
Metabolic disorders, particularly urea cycle disorders
MELAS syndrome
Nausea
Opioid use disorder
Pancreatitis
Pernicious anemia
Psychosis
Schizophrenia
Side effect of drugs
Stimulant use disorder
Stomach flu
Stress
Sickness behavior
Superior mesenteric artery syndrome
Syndrome of inappropriate antidiuretic hormone secretion
Tuberculosis
Thalassemia
Ulcerative colitis
Uremia
Vitamin B12 deficiency
Zinc deficiency
Infection: Anorexia of infection is part of the acute phase response (APR) to infection. The APR can be triggered by lipopolysaccharides and peptidoglycans from bacterial cell walls, bacterial DNA, and double-stranded viral RNA, and viral glycoproteins, which can trigger production of a variety of proinflammatory cytokines. These can have an indirect effect on appetite by a number of means, including peripheral afferents from their sites of production in the body, by enhancing production of leptin from fat stores. Inflammatory cytokines can also signal to the central nervous system more directly by specialized transport mechanisms through the blood–brain barrier, via circumventricular organs (which are outside the barrier), or by triggering production of eicosanoids in the endothelial cells of the brain vasculature. Ultimately, the control of appetite by this mechanism is thought to be mediated by the same factors normally controlling appetite, such as neurotransmitters (serotonin, dopamine, histamine, norepinephrine, corticotropin releasing factor, neuropeptide Y, and α-melanocyte-stimulating hormone).

Drugs

Stimulants, such as ephedrine, amphetamine, methamphetamine, MDMA, cathinone, methylphenidate, nicotine, cocaine, caffeine, etc.
Horomones which are produced by adrenal glands and used as medication such as adrenaline.
Narcotics, such as heroin, morphine, codeine, hydrocodone, oxycodone, etc.
Antidepressants can have anorexia as a side effect, primarily selective serotonin reuptake inhibitors (SSRIs) such as fluoxetine.
 Byetta, a type II diabetes drug, will cause moderate nausea and loss of appetite.
 Abruptly stopping appetite-increasing drugs, such as cannabis and corticosteroids.
 Chemicals that are members of the phenethylamine group. (Individuals with anorexia nervosa may seek them to suppress appetite.)
Topiramate may cause anorexia as a side effect.
 Other drugs may be used to intentionally cause anorexia in order to help a patient preoperative fasting prior to general anesthesia. It is important to avoid food before surgery to mitigate the risk of pulmonary aspiration, which can be fatal.

Other
 During the post-operative recovery period for a tonsillectomy or adenoidectomy, it is common for adult patients to experience a lack of appetite until their throat significantly heals (usually 10–14 days).
 Altitude sickness
 Significant emotional pain caused by an event (rather than a mental disorder) can cause an individual to temporarily lose all interest in food.
 Several Twelve-step programs including Overeaters Anonymous tackle psychological issues members believe lead to forms of deprivation
 Psychological stress
 Experiencing grotesque or unappealing thoughts or conversations, or viewing similar images
 Being in the presence of unappealing things such as waste matter, dead organisms, or bad smells

Complications
Complications of anorexia may result due to poor food intake. Poor food intake can lead to dehydration, electrolyte imbalances, anemia and nutritional deficiencies. These imbalances will worsen the longer that food is avoided.

Sudden cardiac death
Anorexia is a relatively common condition that can lead patients to have dangerous electrolyte imbalances, leading to acquired long QT syndrome which can result in sudden cardiac death. This can develop over a prolonged period of time, and the risk is further heightened when feeding resumes after a period of abstaining from consumption.

Refeeding syndrome 
Care must be taken when a patient begins to eat after prolonged starvation to avoid the potentially fatal complications of refeeding syndrome. The initial signs of refeeding syndrome are minimal, but can rapidly progress to death. Thus, the reinitiation of food or oral intake is usually started slowly and requires close observation under supervision by trained healthcare professionals. This is usually done in a hospital or nutritional rehabilitation center.

Management 
Anorexia can be treated with the help of orexigenic drugs.

"Anorexia" vs "anorexic" vs anorexia nervosa 
Anorexic is a description of somebody with the stereotypical thin, frail, malnourished appearance. The appearance is classically associated with anorexia, although in rare cases do patients end up becoming anorexic. An anorexic or anorectic is also a description given to substances that cause anorexia for weight loss purposes.

Anorexia nervosa is an eating disorder characterized by food restriction due to the strong desire to remain thin. It is considered a mental health diagnosis where people see themselves as obese regardless of their weight or appearance. The person does not necessarily exhibit anorexia as a symptom in their quest to restrict food intake.

References

External links

Symptoms and signs: Endocrinology, nutrition, and metabolism